Belostok Oblast was an administrative division in the Russian Empire. The region had a capital in Belostok (modern Białystok).

History
The oblast was created from former Prussian Białystok Department (until 1795 Białystok in Poland), gained in 1807 by Russia in the Treaties of Tilsit.

The oblast was abolished in 1842 when it was included into Grodno Governorate.

Administrative divisions

In the 19th century, some of the oblasts were administrative divisions which had a status roughly equal to that of the guberniyas; i.e., they existed independently from the guberniyas, not as their parts as it used to be the case in the 18th century.

In 1808, the Oblast was divided into four uyezds (districts): 
Belostok including the cities of  Białystok, Choroszcz, Goniądz, Gródek, Knyszyn, Suraż, Trzcianne and Zabłudów
Bielsk including the cities of Bielsk Podlaski, Boćki, Brańsk, Kleszczele, Narew and Orla
Sokółka including the cities of Dąbrowa Białostocka, Janów, Korycin, Kuźnica, Nowy Dwór, Odelsk, Sidra, Sokółka, Suchowola and Wasilków
Drohiczyn including the cities of Ciechanowiec, Drohiczyn, Mielnik, Niemirów and Siemiatycze

In 1842 the number of districts was reduced to three when Drohiczyn District was merged into Bielsk District.

References

Geographic history of Poland
History of Białystok
Oblasts of the Russian Empire